Bimbo Bakeries USA, Inc. is the American corporate arm of the Mexican multinational bakery product manufacturing company Grupo Bimbo. It is the largest bakery company in the United States. The company, headquartered in Horsham, Pennsylvania, a suburb of Philadelphia, owns many fresh bread and sweet baked goods brands in the United States, including Entenmann's, Sara Lee, and Thomas'. It is also a top advertising sponsor for many major soccer teams around the globe.

Name

The name "Bimbo" was first coined in 1945 when the company switched from Super Pan S.A. A blend of the words "bingo" and "Bambi", the name's innocent, childlike associations fit the image that the company wished to build. The English word "bimbo", with its negative connotations, has no cognate in Spanish.

History

Bimbo Bakeries USA's story began in 1994, when Grupo Bimbo – Mexico's largest baking company, with operations in 21 countries – purchased La Hacienda, a California-based tortilla company. Bimbo Bakeries USA then entered the U.S. bread market in 1997 with the acquisition of Pacific Pride Bakeries of San Diego.

The company grew again in 1998 with the purchase of Mrs Baird's Bakeries in Texas, which at the time was the largest family-owned bakery in the U.S. The combined operations were renamed Bimbo Bakeries USA (BBU).

In 2002, BBU acquired the Western U.S. baking business of George Weston Ltd., adding such iconic premium brands as Oroweat, Entenmann's, Thomas’, and Boboli. In 2008, Grupo Bimbo purchased the remaining U.S. fresh baked goods business of George Weston Ltd., adding brands such as Arnold, Brownberry, Freihofer's, and Stroehmann.

In 2011, BBU completed its largest acquisition to date: Sara Lee's North American fresh bakery business. Adding Sara Lee's bread business doubled BBU in size.

In 2020, BBU acquired Lender's Bagels from Conagra Brands

Today, BBU operates more than 60 bakeries, employs more than 20,000 workers, and distributes products through 11,000 sales routes throughout the United States.

Kosher certification
In 2018, the company announced that it would not be renewing its Kosher certification. As the largest baking company in the US, the decision caused significant concern amongst American Jews, especially those who live outside areas with significant Jewish populations. Kosher breads are required to be non-dairy unless explicitly labelled because Jewish dietary restrictions prohibit consuming dairy and meat at the same meal. Kosher bread is thus almost always pareve. The company said they wanted the option to produce bread on factory lines that might include dairy products, which they are not able to do if they remain kosher certified.

Nationwide expansion

On December 10, 2008, it was announced that Grupo Bimbo was in negotiations to purchase Weston Foods Inc., a subsidiary of George Weston Ltd. for $2.38 billion, a purchase that would make Bimbo Bakeries USA the largest bakery company in the USA. The purchase was finalized on January 21, 2009. The acquisition added brands such as Arnold, Brownberry, Freihofer's, Stroehmann, and gave Bimbo the rights to the Weston brands in the eastern United States (it had controlled the Weston brands in the western United States since 2002). The purchase also added 22 more factories and 4,000 delivery trucks, giving Bimbo Bakeries USA 35 factories and over 7,000 sales routes in the United States, along with a footprint in all of the lower 48 states and almost US$4 billion in annual sales. The Weston Foods headquarters in Horsham, Pennsylvania (just outside Philadelphia) became the new headquarters for Bimbo's USA operations, relocating from Fort Worth, Texas, when the deal closed.

Soccer sponsorship
In an effort to increase its national exposure, on January 11, 2011, Bimbo announced a four-year partnership agreement making it the official jersey sponsor of the Philadelphia Union, the Major League Soccer (MLS) team local to their national headquarters. The Union sponsorship agreement marks the fifth professional soccer team sponsored by Bimbo; the parent company Grupo Bimbo sponsors the following five teams: Rochester Rhinos, Club América, C.D. Guadalajara and C.F. Monterrey of the Primera División de México teams, and C.D. Saprissa of Costa Rica. The deal also makes Bimbo the official bread and baked goods sponsor of the Union and MLS. Bimbo will become an official sponsor of MLS, opening MLS League and Club marketing assets, such as stadium signage, to the company. The sponsorship deal is valued at roughly US$12 million over the four-year period.

Sara Lee acquisition
On November 9, 2010, Grupo Bimbo announced that it had agreed to acquire the North American fresh bakery business of the Sara Lee Corporation. The transaction, which was subject to regulatory review, would combine the largest and third-largest baking companies in the United States, as measured by annual sales. The deal was reported as costing US$959 million. This acquisition left Bimbo Bakeries USA with 75 bakeries in 31 states, serving the entire continental United States through more than 13,000 sales routes.

The acquisition was estimated to bring about US$2.1 billion in sales to Bimbo Bakeries USA, for a rough total of US$6 billion. This would make Bimbo Bakeries USA more than twice as large as the number-two bakery company in the United States, Flowers Foods.

Sara Lee Corp. acquired its fresh-baked division in 2001 with the acquisition of Earthgrains for a then industry record of US$2.8 billion. This sale represents a 66% discount.

In November 2011, Sara Lee Corporation completed the sale of its North American fresh bakery business to Grupo Bimbo for $709 million. Sara Lee also sold its fresh-bakery businesses in Spain and Portugal to Grupo Bimbo for 115 million euros ($158.3 million), in a deal announced in October, 2011. That acquisition was expected to close by the end of 2011.

Bimbo Bakeries was required to sell off some of its assets by the antitrust division of the United States Department of Justice. The following operations were sold:

 Earthgrains and Healthy Choice in Omaha were sold to Pan-O-Gold in May 2012. 
Holsum and Milano in Harrisburg and Scranton were sold to Schmidt Baking Company in May 2012.
Sara Lee and Earthgrains in California and Earthgrains in Oklahoma City were sold to Flowers Foods in October 2012.

The EarthGrains and Mrs Baird's brands in Kansas City have yet to be sold.

Main brands

 Arnold – Producer of loaf bread primarily sold throughout the United States
 Ball Park – Producer of buns & rolls
Bays – Producer of English muffins
 Beefsteak – Producer of bread
 Bimbo – Producing cakes and bread, found in major United States cities with large Hispanic and Hispanic-American populations
 Boboli – Producer of ready-made pizza crusts
 Brownberry – Producer of loaf bread primarily sold throughout the United States
 Colombo – Producer of sweet and sourdough bread products. Formerly Colombo Baking Company.
 EarthGrains – Producer of loaf bread primarily sold throughout the United States
 Entenmann's – Pastry baker in the United States
 Francisco – Producer of bread and rolls
 Freihofer's – Producer of bread and cakes most commonly found in upstate New York
 Grandma Sycamore's – Producer of homemade breads, based in Utah and found in the intermountain west area 
 J.J. Nissen – Producer of bread commonly found in New England
 Lender's Bagels – Producer of bagels
 Marinela – Producer of Mexican cookies and pastry
 Mrs. Baird's – A leading bakery primarily present in Texas and surrounding states
 Old Country – Restaurant bread
 Oroweat – Producer of loaf bread primarily sold throughout the United States
 Sara Lee – North America Fresh Bakery unit only.
 Stroehmann – Producer of loaf bread in the United States
 Thomas' – Producer of English muffins and bagels
 Tía Rosa – Producer of home-style bread, pastry, and tortillas
 Barcel – Producer of takis, Takis Kettlez, and associated varieties.

See also
 List of bakeries
 List of brand name breads

References

External links

 

Grupo Bimbo subsidiaries
Bakeries of the United States
Companies based in Montgomery County, Pennsylvania
Food and drink companies established in 1996
1996 establishments in Pennsylvania
American subsidiaries of foreign companies